The Vineland Social Maturity Scale is a psychometric assessment instrument designed to help in the assessment of social competence. It was developed by the American psychologist Edgar Arnold Doll and published in 1940. He published a manual for it in 1953. Doll named it after the Vineland Training School for the Mentally Retarded, where he developed it.

Details
The test consists of 8 sub-scales measuring:
 Communication skills
 General self-help ability
 Locomotion skills
 Occupation skills
 Self-direction
 Self-help eating
 Self-help dressing
 Socialization skills

See also 
 Vineland Adaptive Behavior Scale

References

External resources
 
 
 
 
 
 
 
 
 
 
 

Cognitive tests
Pediatrics
Child development